Horrible Bosses 2 is a 2014 American crime comedy film directed by Sean Anders and written by Anders and John Morris. A sequel to 2011's Horrible Bosses, the film stars Jason Bateman, Charlie Day, Jason Sudeikis, Jennifer Aniston, Jamie Foxx, Chris Pine, and Christoph Waltz. The plot follows Nick (Bateman), Kurt (Sudeikis), and Dale (Day) as they kidnap the son (Pine) of a millionaire investor (Waltz) in order to blackmail him out of revenge after he screws them over on a business deal. It was released by Warner Bros. Pictures on November 26, 2014, received mixed reviews and grossed $107 million worldwide.

Plot
Three years after the first film, Nick, Dale, and Kurt invent a car wash-inspired shower head, the "Shower Buddy". They are approached by Bert Hanson and his son Rex, and Bert agrees to invest if they can make 100,000 units.

With a business loan, the trio outfit a warehouse, producing the quota. However, Bert backs out, as he never signed an agreement, and tells them that he plans to take their inventory in foreclosure and sell them (renamed as the "Shower Pal") himself, leaving them in debt $500,000 with their outstanding loan.

Seeking financial advice, the three visit Nick's imprisoned former boss, Dave Harken, who says they have no feasible legal way to recover their losses. They then resolve to kidnap Rex for ransom. Seeking "Motherfucker" Jones' help, he suggests keeping the victim unconscious the entire kidnapping. Their ransom note asks for $500,000. They go to the office of Dale's former boss, Dr. Julia Harris, to steal nitrous oxide. While there, Kurt and Dale are almost caught by members of Julia's sex addiction support group; once they leave, Nick distracts Julia, allowing Dale and Kurt to escape.

At Rex's, while hiding in the closet, Dale accidentally knocks them out with the gas. Waking up in the morning, Rex is gone. Returning to the warehouse, they find him tied up in their trunk. Getting out, he reveals he found them in his closet, but stages his own kidnapping. Rex sent the ransom note to Bert, increasing the ransom to $5 million. The three doubt Rex's plan, but he threatens to go to the police if they back out. They call Bert to inform him of Rex's kidnapping, threatening to kill him if the police are summoned. However the police, led by Detective Hatcher, subsequently arrive at the warehouse to question the suspects.

When the police leave, Rex breaks down when he finds out Bert cares more about his money than him. Now sympathetic, the trio agrees to do the fake kidnapping together. They form a plan to outsmart the police and get the ransom money. Using untraceable phones, a basement garage to block out any tracking signal, and Kurt disguised as Bert. While the plan is in motion, the trio realize Kurt mistakenly left Bert his own phone instead of the untraceable one to give Bert instructions. Nevertheless they use Kurt's phone to give. Before leaving, Julia arrives, demanding Dale sleep with her or she will report them for breaking into her office. Dale's wife Stacy, with their three daughters, unexpectedly arrives. Believing he is cheating with Julia, she storms off. Dale angrily locks Julia in the bathroom so they can leave.

In the basement garage, they demand Bert give them the money and the cell phone. However, Bert is killed by Rex, who reveals that, when his father did not care about him, he decided to kill him, framing them to inherit everything. As they are pursued by the police, Jones arrives. Anticipating they would be killed, he was going to take the ransom money himself.

Jones drives them to the warehouse so they can prove their innocence. Upon arrival, he escapes with the money and the police find Rex tied up. Before they arrest the trio, Kurt's phone rings in Rex's pocket; the police recognize the ringtone as that left to Bert by the kidnappers. When Rex claims the phone is his, Hatcher asks why he did not call the police if he had a phone, so he takes him hostage. When Dale attempts to attack Rex, Rex shoots him. Hatcher subdues and arrests him, thanks to the distraction.

Dale wakes up in the hospital. As Dale helped save Hatcher's life, the charges were dropped. Julia helped with Stacy, although hints at having raped him during his coma and promises to have sex with his wife as well. In the end, their business goes into foreclosure but Harken buys it, allowing the trio to stay employed. Jones, meanwhile, uses the ransom money to invest in Pinkberry.

Cast
 Jason Bateman as Nick Hendricks
 Jason Sudeikis as Kurt Buckman
 Charlie Day as Dale Arbus
 Chris Pine as Rex Hanson
 Jennifer Aniston as Dr. Julia Harris
 Jamie Foxx as Dean "Motherfucker" Jones
 Kevin Spacey as David Harken
 Christoph Waltz as Bert Hanson
 Jonathan Banks as Detective Hatcher
 Lindsay Sloane as Stacy Arbus
 Keegan-Michael Key as Mike
 Kelly Stables as Rachel
 Jerry Lambert as Skip
 Brianne Howey as Candy
 Lennon Parham as Roz
 Suzy Nakamura as Kim
 Brandon Richardson as Blake
 Keeley Hazell as Miss Lang
 Bruno Amato as Sex Addict Police Officer
 Sam Richardson as Producer
 Andy Buckley as Surveillance Audio Agent
 Rob Huebel as Pinkberry Executive
 Brendan Hunt as Sex Addict
 Rebecca Field as Sex Addict
 Shelby Chesnes as Jogger (Cameo)
 Will Forte as Derelict (Cameo)

Production
Following the first film's release in July 2011, director Seth Gordon confirmed that talks were underway for a sequel due to the financial success of the film in the United States, saying: "Yeah, we've definitely discussed it. It's done well in the States, the film has, so that's becoming a more concerted effort now, we're trying to figure out what the sequel could be." On January 4, 2012, it was confirmed that a sequel was moving forward and that screenwriters John Francis Daley and Jonathan Goldstein would be returning to write the script. At this time, New Line Cinema was reported to be negotiating with Gordon to return as director as well as with Jason Bateman, Charlie Day, and Jason Sudeikis to return in the lead roles. On February 27, 2012, it was confirmed that Goldstein and Daley were in the process of writing the new script. In March 2013, Goldstein and Daley confirmed that they had submitted multiple draft scripts for the sequel, and that production had moved towards finalizing the budget. Later in the same month Bateman, Day, and Sudeikis were confirmed to be reprising their roles, with Jamie Foxx negotiating to return. The film was once again produced by Brett Ratner and Jay Stern.

In August 2013, it was announced that Gordon would not be returning to direct because of scheduling conflicts and that the studio was actively searching for a replacement. In September 2013, Sean Anders was announced as Gordon's replacement, with John Morris joining the production as a producer. The pair had previously performed a rewrite on Goldstein's and Daley's sequel script. In September 2013, Jennifer Aniston signed on to reprise her role as Julia Harris.

Principal photography took place in Burbank, California, between September 2013 and June 2014.

Release
The first trailer was released on September 30, 2014.

On September 27, 2013, it was announced that the film would be released on November 26, 2014.

Box office
Horrible Bosses 2 grossed $54.4 million in North America and $53.2 million in other territories for a total worldwide gross of $107.7 million worldwide, against a budget of $57 million. This was just over half its predecessor's total gross of $209 million.

The film was released in 3,321 theaters in the United States and Canada on November 26, 2014. It earned $1 million from Tuesday night previews and $4.3 million (including previews) on its opening day. The next day on Thanksgiving Day it earned $3.1 million, for a two-day total of $7.3 million. On Friday the film earned $6.2 million. In its opening weekend it earned $15.5 million (a five-day total of $23 million), finishing fifth at the box office.

Outside North America, the film was released to 42 markets and earned $11.7 million from 4,900 screens. The highest debuts came from Russia ($2.3  million), the United Kingdom ($2 million), Mexico ($1.13 million) and Germany ($1 million).

Critical response
On Rotten Tomatoes, the film has an approval rating of 34% based on 155 reviews and an average rating of 4.6/10. The site's critical consensus reads, "Horrible Bosses 2 may trigger a few belly laughs among big fans of the original, but all in all, it's a waste of a strong cast that fails to justify its own existence." On Metacritic, the film has a score of 40 out of 100 based on 36 critics, indicating "mixed or average reviews". Audiences polled by CinemaScore gave the film an average grade of "B+" on an A+ to F scale, the same grade earned by its predecessor.

Justin Lowe of The Hollywood Reporter said, "The jokes start growing stale well before the film's midpoint." Justin Chang of Variety called the film an "inane and incredibly tasteless sequel." Dan Callahan of TheWrap told that "the result is puerile, ugly and painfully unfunny." Moira MacDonald of The Seattle Times gave the film one and a half stars out of four, saying "Lots of gags fly by, many of them in questionable taste (some downright offensive) and most of them unfunny." Claudia Puig of USA Today gave the film one out of four stars, saying "This ill-conceived sequel to 2011's entertaining Horrible Bosses is base, moronic, insulting and vulgar. It's also cringingly unfunny." Tom Russo of The Boston Globe gave the film two and a half out of four stars and said, "A new misadventure whose negligibly refined formula somehow ends up being more consistently entertaining." Stephen Holden of The New York Times said that the film is "one of the sloppiest and most unnecessary Hollywood sequels ever made, isn't dirtier or more offensive than its 2011 forerunner. But it is infinitely dumber and not half as funny."

Kyle Smith of the New York Post gave one out of four stars, saying "Duct tape, thick rope and the threat of being shot all figure prominently in Horrible Bosses 2. All would have been required to keep me in my seat if it weren't my job to report back on this factory-issued sequel." Betsy Sharkey of Los Angeles Times said, "Make no mistake, despite some well-earned laughs, Horrible Bosses 2 is not what qualifies as a good movie or even a particularly good R-rated comedy." Joe Williams of St. Louis Post-Dispatch gave the film two out of four stars and said, "Horrible Bosses 2 is further proof that likable actors have to take an occasional sick day." James Berardinelli gave the film one and a half stars out of four and wrote for ReelViews, "Horrible Bosses 2 (emphasis on "horrible") is an apt title for this repugnant, unnecessary sequel."

Home media
The film was released on DVD and Blu-ray on February 24, 2015. Like the first film, the Blu-ray release contains an extended version, which runs an additional eight minutes longer than the 108-minute theatrical cut.

See also

References

External links
 
 
 
 
 

2014 films
2014 black comedy films
2010s buddy comedy films
2010s crime comedy films
American black comedy films
American buddy comedy films
American crime comedy films
American sequel films
Dune Entertainment films
Films produced by John Morris
Films scored by Christopher Lennertz
Films directed by Sean Anders
Films shot in Los Angeles County, California
New Line Cinema films
Films with screenplays by John Morris
Films with screenplays by Sean Anders
Warner Bros. films
Patricide in fiction
2010s English-language films
2010s American films